Dalzell is an unincorporated community in Meade County, in the U.S. state of South Dakota.

History
A post office called Dalzell was established in 1893, and remained in operation until 1953. According to the Federal Writers' Project, the origin of the name Dalzell is obscure.

References

Unincorporated communities in Meade County, South Dakota
Unincorporated communities in South Dakota